Arif İsayev (born 28 July 1985 in Baku) is an Azerbaijani retired footballer who played as an attacking midfielder in both Azerbaijan and Turkey.

Career

Club
In the summer of 2012, İsayev left Gabala to join AZAL, six months later İsayev left AZAL to join Denizlispor on a contract until the summer 2014. In November 2013 İsayev had his contract with Denizlispor terminated by mutual consent.

Career statistics

Club

International

Statistics accurate as of match played 29 May 2013

References

External links
 
 
 Profile at footballdatabase.eu

1985 births
Living people
Footballers from Baku
Azerbaijani footballers
Azerbaijani expatriate footballers
Expatriate footballers in Turkey
Azerbaijani expatriate sportspeople in Turkey
Gabala FC players
Denizlispor footballers
AZAL PFK players
TFF First League players
Association football midfielders
Azerbaijan international footballers
FK Genclerbirliyi Sumqayit players